The Keefer Sandstone is a geologic formation in West Virginia. It preserves fossils dating back to the Silurian period.

See also

 List of fossiliferous stratigraphic units in West Virginia

References

 

Silurian Maryland
Silurian West Virginia
Silurian geology of Virginia
Silurian southern paleotemperate deposits